Alvin Derald Etler (February 19, 1913 – June 13, 1973) was an American composer and oboist.

Career 
A student of Paul Hindemith, Etler is noted for his highly rhythmic, harmonically and texturally complex compositional style, taking inspiration from the works of Bartók and Copland as well as the dissonant and accented styles of jazz.

Though he played with the Indianapolis Symphony in 1938, he abandoned his orchestral life shortly thereafter to focus on his increasingly successful compositional career (which earned him two Guggenheim Fellowships during this period). In 1942 he joined the faculty at Yale University as conductor of the university band and instructor of wind instruments, where he began his studies with Hindemith. He also taught at Cornell University and University of Illinois before accepting a position at Smith College, which he held until his death.

Notable works include his two woodwind quintets (from 1955 and 1957), a bassoon sonata, the 1963 "Quintet for Brass Instruments", and "Fragments" for woodwind quartet.

Etler is also the author of Making Music: An Introduction to Theory, an introductory-level theory text published posthumously in 1974.

Works list

Orchestral
Passacaglia and Fugue, 1947
Concerto for string quartet and string orchestra, 1948
Symphony, 1951
Dramatic Overture, 1956 
Concerto in 1 movement, 1957
Elegy, 1959
Concerto for wind quintet and orchestra, 1960 
Triptych, 1961 
Concerto for brass quintet, string orchestra, and percussion, 1967 
Convivialities, 1967 
Concerto for string quartet and orchestra, 1968

Chamber music
Sonata for oboe, clarinet and viola, 1945 
Quartet for oboe, clarinet, viola and bassoon, 1949 
Prelude and Toccata, for organ, 1950 
Bassoon Sonata, 1951 
Clarinet Sonata no.1, 1952 
Introduction and Allegro, for oboe and piano, 1952 
Duo, for oboe and viola, 1954 
Sonatina, for piano 1955 
Wind Quintet, 1955
Wind Quintet No. 2, 1957 
Concerto for violin and wind quintet, 1958 
Sonata for viola and harpsichord, 1959 
Sextet for oboe, clarinet, bassoon, violin, viola and cello, 1959 
Suite, for flute, oboe and clarinet, 1960 
Concerto, for clarinet and chamber ensemble, 1962 
String Quartet No. 1, 1963 
Brass Quintet, 1963 
String Quartet No. 2, 1965
Sonic Sequence, for brass quintet, 1967 
Clarinet Sonata No. 2, 1969 
XL plus 1, for solo percussion, 1970 
Concerto for cello and seven instruments, 1970

Choral
Peace be unto You (St Augustine, Bible: Matthew), SATB, 1958 
Under the Cottonwood Tree (Etler), SA, 1960 
Under Stars (Etler), SSAA, 1960 
Ode to Pothos (Etler), SSAATTBB, 1960 
Onomatopoesis (Etler), Male singer, 2 clarinets, bass clarinet, bassoon, 2 trumpets, horn, trombone, and percussion, 1965

References 
Grove Dictionary of Music and Musicians, "Alvin Etler"

External links 
Associated Music Publishers, Inc.
 (as Alvin Derold Etler)

1913 births
1973 deaths
20th-century classical composers
American male classical composers
American classical composers
Cornell University faculty
Yale University faculty
University of Illinois faculty
Smith College faculty
American classical oboists
Male oboists
Pupils of Paul Hindemith
20th-century American composers
20th-century American male musicians